Senator Ritchie may refer to:

James H. Ritchie Jr. (born 1961), South Carolina State Senate
Patty Ritchie (born 1962), New York State Senate